John Arthur Billman (December 1, 1919 – March 16, 2012) was an American football guard who played two seasons in the All-America Football Conference with the Brooklyn Dodgers and Chicago Rockets. He was drafted by the Philadelphia Eagles in the eleventh round of the 1943 NFL Draft. He played college football at the University of Minnesota and attended Edison High School in Minneapolis, Minnesota.

Early years
Billman played high school football for the Edison High School Tommies.

College career
Billman played for the Minnesota Golden Gophers from 1939 to 1942. He played in the East–West Shrine Game on January 1, 1943. He graduated with in 1943 with a BA in Liberal Arts and an associates degree in Mortuary Science. Billman also joined Sigma Alpha Epsilon while at the University of Minnesota.

Military career
Billman joined the Navy V7 program in 1941 and received orders for active duty the morning after his college graduation. He trained in motor torpedo boat operations and was a PT boat captain with Squadron 9 in the South Pacific. He was discharged in May 1946.

Professional career
Billman was selected by the Philadelphia Eagles with the 92nd pick in the 1943 NFL Draft. He played in two games for the Brooklyn Dodgers in 1946. He played in two games for the Chicago Rockets in 1947.

Personal life
Billman joined his father in the mortuary business after his football career and expanded the business to include funeral chapels in Wayzata, Minneapolis and St. Louis Park. He joined the Naval Reserve as a personnel officer in 1948 and served on active duty from 1950 to 1952. He retired from the Naval Reserve in 1970 as a commander. Billman later retired from the mortuary business in 1983. He was a direct descendant of the Mayflower on his mother's side.

References

External links
Just Sports Stats
 

1919 births
2012 deaths
20th-century American businesspeople
American football guards
Minnesota Golden Gophers football players
Brooklyn Dodgers (AAFC) players
Chicago Rockets players
United States Navy officers
United States Navy reservists
Businesspeople from Minnesota
Players of American football from Minneapolis
United States Navy personnel of World War II
Edison High School (Minnesota) alumni